William Converse-Roberts is an American actor. He was born William Converse Roberts in Needham, Massachusetts. He attended both Stony Brook University and the Yale School of Drama.  In 1989, he won an Obie Award for his performance in an Off-Broadway production of Love's Labour's Lost.  He resides in Los Angeles County, California.

Selected filmography

Another World (1981, TV Series) - Blue
 American Playhouse (episode: "Story of a Marriage", 1982) 
1918 (1985) - Horace Robedaux
 Stone Pillow (1985) - Max
On Valentine's Day (1986) - Horace Robedaux
 Spenser: For Hire (episode: "The Heart of the Matter"; 1987) 
 Crime Story (1987) - Altman ("The Survivor" & "The Kingdom of Money", both 1987) 
The Equalizer (episodes: "Suspicion of Innocence" (1987) & "Making of a Martyr" (1989))
The Days and Nights of Molly Dodd  (1991). 
Reasonable Doubts (1991–1993, TV Series) - Dist. Atty. Arthur Gold
 The Commish  (1994) - Doug Magruder (episodes: "The Lady Vanishes" & "Doug Magruder")   
Murder, She Wrote (episode: "Home Care", 1995) - Justin 
John Grisham's The Client - Dr. Gus Gardoni ("Money Talks", "Good Samaritan", "Past Imperfect", all 1996)
Dangerous Minds (episodes: "Toe Me Up, Toe Me Down", 1997) & "Moonstruck", "Trust Me", both 1996) 
Kiss the Girls (1997) - Dr. Wick Sachs
Crazy in Alabama (1999) - Murphy
Drive Me Crazy (1999) - Mr. Hammond
 The District (2000) - Congressman Donner (episode: "The Jackal") 
Bandits (2001) - Charles Wheeler
The Practice (episodes: "Gideon's Crossover" & "Eat and Run")
Any Day Now (2002) - Matt O'Brien
Firefly (episode "Safe", 2002) - Gabriel Tam

References

External links
 
 
 

20th-century American male actors
21st-century American male actors
American male stage actors
American male television actors
Obie Award recipients
Stony Brook University alumni
Yale School of Drama alumni
Living people
Year of birth missing (living people)